is a single by Japanese idol girl group French Kiss, a sub-unit of AKB48. It was released on October 1, 2014. It debuted in 2nd place on the weekly Oricon Singles Chart, with 37,788 copies, and reached 5th place on the Billboard Japan Hot 100.

References 

2014 singles
2014 songs
Japanese-language songs
French Kiss (band) songs
Songs with lyrics by Yasushi Akimoto